Elisaveta Bagryana (16 April, 1893 – 23 March, 1991), born Elisaveta Lyubomirova Belcheva, was a Bulgarian poet who wrote her first verses while living with her family in Veliko Tarnovo in 1907–08. She, along with Dora Gabe (1886–1983), is considered one of the "first ladies of Bulgarian women's literature". She was nominated for the Nobel Prize in Literature three times.

Life

Elisaveta Lyubomirova Belcheva was born on April 16, 1893 in Sofia, Bulgaria in a clerk's family. She finished her primary and secondary education in the capital city. She lived a year (1907-08) with her family in the town of Tarnovo, where she wrote her first poems. Between 1910 and 1911 she taught in the village of Aftani, where she experienced rural life, after which she studied Slavic philology at Sofia University. Her first poems — Why and Night Song  — were published in 1915 in the magazine Contemporary Thought.

It was after World War I ended that she truly entered into the literary world, at a time when poetry was undergoing a transformation. By 1921, she was already active in the literary life, and was collaborating on the Newspaper of the Woman and the magazine Modernity, among other publications.

With the arrival of her first book, The Eternal and the Holy (1927), she earned the confirmation of her peers. She also started writing children's stories.
Her poems are straightforward, sensitive and serious, as in The Well, a fable-like piece relating a well she dug when a little girl to the wellspring of poetry in her soul. They often are undeniably feminine – as in the poem The Eternal, in which the writer contemplates the body of a dead mother, or Evening Prayer – and spirited, as shown by the youthful, rebellious spirit in The Elements.

Bagryana passed her life surrounded by words, editing a number of magazines and writing. Her works have been translated into over 30 languages. Her poems are most recently available in a book entitled Penelope of the 21st Century: Selected poems of Elisaveta Bagryana, translated by Brenda Walker. She died in 1991, aged 97.

Bagryana was a friend of communist activist Pétar Russév, father of Brazilian politician Dilma Rousseff, who won election as Brazil's first female President on 31 October 2010.

Works in English

Penelope of the twentieth century: selected poems of Elisaveta Bagryana  translators Brenda Walker, Belin Tonchev, Valentine Borrisov, Forest, 1993. 
Voices of Sibyls: Three Bulgarian Poets--Elisaveta Bagryana, Nevena Stefanova, Snezhina Slavova, Translator Yuri Vidov Karageorge, Morris Pub., 1996.

Awards and honours
 In 1943, 1944, and 1945 she was nominated for a Nobel Prize in literature. 
 In 1969, she won a gold medal from the National Association of Poets in Rome.
 Bagryana Point in Antarctica is named after Elisaveta Bagryana.

See also
 List of Bulgarian-language poets

References

External links

 
 Virtual library of Bulgarian literature online.

1893 births
1991 deaths
Writers from Sofia
Burials at Central Sofia Cemetery
Sofia University alumni
Heroes of the People's Republic of Bulgaria
20th-century Bulgarian poets
20th-century Bulgarian women writers
20th-century Bulgarian writers
Bulgarian women poets